
Husthwaite is a village and civil parish in Hambleton district of North Yorkshire, England.

History
The name probably derives from the Middle English 'hous', from Old English 'hus' meaning a house and thwaite - "a piece of land or land cleared of woods and converted to tillage".

There has been a settlement on the site since before the Norman invasion.

The village was served by the Thirsk and Malton Line at a station near the Elphin Bridge.

There was a Wesleyan Chapel built in 1841 in the village, now private residence. A new Methodist building was built in 1928 next door to the old chapel.

Governance
The village lies within the Thirsk and Malton UK Parliament constituency. It also is within the Stillington electoral division of North Yorkshire County Council and the White Horse ward of Hambleton District Council. The local Parish Council has seven members.

Geography
The nearest settlements are Coxwold  to the north-east; Oulston  to the east; Carlton Husthwaite  to the north-west; Thormanby  to the west and Easingwold  to the south. Elphin Beck runs to the north of the village and is part of the tributary system of the River Swale.

The 1881 UK Census recorded the population as 436. The 2001 UK Census recorded the population as 417, of which 304 were over the age of sixteen and 194 of those were in employment. There were 175 dwellings of which 94 were detached. The 2011 Census recorded a population of 404.

Community

Husthwaite is served as part of the no. 31X bus route between York and Helmsley.

The village school is Husthwaite CE Primary.

Husthwaite church is dedicated to St Nicholas. Some of the original Norman church remains, but it was mostly rebuilt in 1683. It is a Grade II* listed building.

Notable people
William Peckitt, stained glass artist was born in the village in 1731.

References

External links

Villages in North Yorkshire
Civil parishes in North Yorkshire
Hambleton District